Aunt Edwina is a 1959 comedy play by the British writer William Douglas Home.

It premiered at Devonshire Park Theatre in Eastbourne before beginning a run of 101 performances in London between 3 November 1959 and 6 February 1960 initially at the Fortune Theatre in the West End before transferring to the Lyric Theatre in Hammersmith. The London cast included Henry Kendall, Margaretta Scott, Cyril Raymond (later replaced by Geoffrey Lumsden),  Nicholas Selby, Peter Cellier and Hilary Tindall.

References

Bibliography
 Wearing, J.P. The London Stage 1950-1959: A Calendar of Productions, Performers, and Personnel.  Rowman & Littlefield, 2014.

1959 plays
West End plays
Comedy plays
Plays by William Douglas-Home